Pamela Jayne Soles (née Hardon; born July 17, 1950) is a German-born American actress. She made her film debut in 1976 as Norma Watson in Brian De Palma's Carrie (1976) before portraying Lynda van der Klok in John Carpenter's Halloween (1978) and Riff Randell in Allan Arkush's Rock 'n' Roll High School (1979).

She has since appeared in a variety of films including Breaking Away (1979), Private Benjamin (1980), Stripes (1981), Sweet Dreams (1985), Jawbreaker (1999), and cult classics like  The Devil's Rejects (2005) and Beg (2011). She has been regarded as a scream queen.

Early life
Soles was born Pamela Jayne Hardon in Frankfurt, Germany, to an American mother from New Jersey, Nancy Hardon (née Seiden; 1922—2006), and a Dutch father from Rotterdam, Cornelis Johannes Hardon II (1922—1994). Her maternal grandparents were Jewish emigrants from Lithuania and Austria. At the time of her birth, her father was working for an international insurance company and the family moved all over the world. Soles lived in Casablanca, Morocco, and Maracaibo, Venezuela, where she learned to speak fluent Spanish, and then Brussels, Belgium, where she went to high school at the International School of Brussels.

Soles attended Briarcliff College in White Plains, New York, later transferring to Georgetown University,   This career goal changed when she visited the Actors Studio in New York City, and Soles was inspired to pursue acting.

Career
Soles moved to Manhattan and began acting in commercials and modeling for fashion magazines. In 1974 she was hired by director Perry Henzell to portray a shampoo model in his film No Place Like Home. It would have been her first film appearance, however Henzell was not able to complete the film until 2006. She relocated to Los Angeles in 1975.

She was among the hundreds of actors auditioning for Brian De Palma and George Lucas in their joint casting session for Carrie (1976) and Star Wars (1977). She originally auditioned for the role of Princess Leia in Star Wars but the role ultimately went to Carrie Fisher. However, she was cast as Norma Watson in Brian De Palma's Carrie. She starred alongside Sissy Spacek, Nancy Allen, John Travolta, Amy Irving and Piper Laurie. Originally, her character was just a minor role, and only supposed to have one line, but De Palma liked her so much that he expanded her role, as the secondary antagonist to Allen's Chris Hargensen. Soles was injured on the set during filming, when a blast from a fire hose during the prom scene ruptured her eardrum. 

The same year, she reunited with Carrie co-star John Travolta in Randal Kleiser's television film The Boy in the Plastic Bubble. Subsequently, she went to Georgia to film Our Winning Season (1978) and met actor Dennis Quaid. They were married in 1978 in Texas on a dude ranch, and both appeared in the film Breaking Away in 1979.

She is most known for her performance as Lynda van der Klok in the classic horror film Halloween (1978) directed by John Carpenter, the final victim of the character Michael Myers. Carpenter wanted her for his film Halloween after seeing Carrie. He wrote the role of Lynda specifically for her because of the way she said the word "totally".

The following year, Soles was cast as Riff Randell in the musical comedy film Rock 'n' Roll High School (1979) with The Ramones. She has a singing credit for a second version of the title song on the movie's soundtrack. She reprised the role of Riff Randell in the artwork for the Local H album Whatever Happened to P.J. Soles?.

In 1980, Soles portrayed Private Wanda Winter in the comedy film Private Benjamin. The following year, she portrayed an MP who becomes Bill Murray's girlfriend, Stella Hansen, in the comedy film Stripes.

In 1981, Soles filmed a new scene to be inserted into the television version of Halloween.

In 1985, Soles starred alongside Jessica Lange as Wanda in Karel Reisz's biographical film Sweet Dreams. In 1999, Soles was cast in the black comedy film Jawbreaker. Soles appeared in The Donnas' music video for "Too Bad About Your Girl" (2003) as her character Riff Randell from Rock 'n' Roll High School. In 2005, Soles played the victim, Susan, of a family on a murderous rampage in the Rob Zombie movie The Devil's Rejects. In 2012, she starred alongside Barbara Steele, Heather Langenkamp, Camille Keaton and Adrienne King in The Butterfly Room.

In 2018, Soles was cast in a spoken cameo role as a teacher in the direct sequel, Halloween, directed by David Gordon Green.

Personal life

She married J. Steven Soles in 1973, when she resided in New York, but then made the move to Los Angeles to work in television and movies. She and Soles subsequently divorced in 1975, although she decided to retain the name P.J. Soles as her stage name. She was later married to actor Dennis Quaid, whom she met on the set of the film Our Winning Season, from 1978 until their divorce in early 1983. Later that same year, she married Skip Holm, who was a stunt pilot on The Right Stuff (1983). They have a son named Sky (born 1983) and a daughter named Ashley (born 1988). She and Holm were divorced in 1998.

Filmography

Film

Television

Other credits
Additional credits
 B.O.R.N. (1989, associate producer)
 Prize Fighter (1993 video game, as 'June')
 Cheap Rodeo: First Night in Heaven (2013 short film, composer)
 Clown Motel (2016 short film, associate producer)

Self appearances
 Halloween' Unmasked 2000 (1999, video short documentary)
 Acting 'Carrie (2001, video short documentary)
 Halloween: A Cut Above the Rest (2003 TV documentary)
 E! True Hollywood Story (2004, episode: "Scream Queens")
 Super Secret Movie Rules (2004, episode: "Slashers")
 Stars & Stripes 1 (2004, video short documentary)
 Stars & Stripes 2 (2004, video short documentary)
 Backstory (2005, episode: "Carrie")
 30 Days in Hell: The Making of 'The Devil's Rejects''' (2005, video documentary)
 Horror's Hallowed Grounds (2006, episode: "Halloween")
 Halloween: The Shape of Horror (2006 short)
 Working with a Master: John Carpenter (2006, video short documentary)
 Halloween: 25 Years of Terror (2006, video documentary)
 The Horrorhound (2007, video documentary)
 Halloween: The Inside Story (2010, TV documentary)
 Staying After Class (2010, video short)
 AM Northwest (2011, episode: "Actress PJ Soles")
 Framelines (2011, Season 1, Episode 5)
 Still Screaming: The Ultimate Scary Movie Retrospective (2011, documentary)
 Underground Entertainment: The Movie (2011, documentary)
 Without Your Head (2011, podcast, episode: "P.J. Soles")
 Up from Down (2013, host)
 Midnight Matinee Psycho (2013, video)
 Psychotic State (2014 film)
 The 50 Best Horror Movies You've Never Seen (2014, documentary)
 Quickies (2015, episode: "P.J. Soles")
 Horror Kung-Fu Theatre (2015–19, 3 episodes)  
 Where It Was Made (2015, episode: "Halloween")
 More Acting 'Carrie' (2016, video short documentary)
 Horror Icon: Inside Michael's Mask with Tony Moran (2016, documentary)
 Looking Back on 'Innocent Prey' - A Conversation with P.J. Soles (2017, video short)
 The Bill Murray Experience (2017, documentary)
 Pickle's Horror Show (2019, episode: "The Ghostman & Rivera Special - Seatbelt Safety")
 Time Warp: The Greatest Cult Films of All-Time, Parts 1-3 (2019, miniseries documentary)
 Class of '79: 40 Years of Rock 'N' Roll High School (2019, video documentary)

In popular culture
 American alternative rock band Local H released an album in 2004 entitled Whatever Happened to P.J. Soles?. The album also includes a song entitled "P.J. Soles".
 Soles is the subject of the song Sweet Pamela Jayne by English rock band The Breakdowns, from their 2014 album Rock 'n' Roller Skates. The song refers to the film Rock 'n' Roll High School'' in its lyrics.

Notes

References

External links

 

1950 births
Living people
20th-century American actresses
21st-century American actresses
Actors Studio alumni
American expatriates in Morocco
American expatriates in Venezuela
American film actresses
American television actresses
American people of Dutch descent
Georgetown College (Georgetown University) alumni
Actors from Frankfurt